The Spanish television mystery music game show Veo cómo cantas premiered the second season on Antena 3 on 29 July 2022.

Gameplay

Format
Under the original format, the contestant can eliminate one or two mystery singers after each round. The game concludes with the last mystery singer standing which depends on the outcome of a duet performance with a guest artist.

Rewards
The contestant must eliminate one mystery singer at the end of each round, receiving  if they eliminate a bad singer. At the end of the game, the contestant may either end the game and keep the money they had won in previous rounds, or risk it for a chance to double its winnings as jackpot prize by correctly guessing whether the last remaining mystery singer is good or bad. If the singer is bad, the contestant's winnings is given to the bad singer instead.

Rounds
Each episode presents the guest artist and contestant with nine people whose identities and singing voices are kept concealed until they are eliminated to perform on the "stage of truth" or remain in the end to perform the final duet.

Episodes

Guest artists

Reception

Television ratings

Source:

Notes

References

Veo cómo cantas
2022 Spanish television seasons